Trilogy of Terror II is a 1996 American made-for-television anthology horror film and a sequel to Trilogy of Terror (1975), both directed by Dan Curtis. The film follows the formula of the original, with one female lead (Lysette Anthony) playing parts in each of three segments. In the episode "He Who Kills", one of the museum security guards is reading a Dark Shadows comic book, and enthuses about how he used to rush home from school to watch it. Dan Curtis created the TV series Dark Shadows in 1966.

Plot

The Graveyard Rats
A wealthy man by the name of Ansford (Matt Clark) discovers his young wife Laura (Lysette Anthony) having an affair with her cousin. Having video proof, he orders Laura to be faithful and honest or he will turn the video over to the news stations and cut her out of his multimillion-dollar will. Meanwhile, her lover Ben (Geraint Wyn Davies) comes up with the idea to murder Ansford and collect all his money. After Ansford is pushed down the stairs and killed, Laura and Ben are more than happy to collect their winnings; however, all does not go as planned. Before dying, Ansford transferred all of his millions into an account in Zürich and microfilmed the access codes, which were buried with him. Now, Laura and Ben have to dig up his grave and Ben climbs into the opened coffin to retrieve the microfilm. Soon after, Laura shoots and kills Ben to claim all the money for herself. All of a sudden, the body of the dead millionaire is dragged through a hole in the side of the coffin by large flesh-eating rats with red eyes and Laura is forced to crawl in after him through a network of underground graveyard tunnels. Eventually, the advancing rats corner her in another buried coffin. Laura tries to keep the rats away by firing her gun at them, but the rats quickly pour into the coffin and devour her.

This first episode (screenplay by William F. Nolan and Dan Curtis) is based on Henry Kuttner's eponymous short story, albeit considerably altered. In Kuttner's tale, the thief is a male cemetery caretaker who habitually steals valuables from the corpses in a graveyard beset by a colony of abnormally large rats.

Bobby

The second episode is a re-filming of a script by Richard Matheson. It was originally written by Matheson for the Dan Curtis omnibus movie Dead of Night and was there filmed with different actors.

It has been some time since Bobby "accidentally" drowned, leaving his mother Alma (Lysette Anthony) depressed and guilty. However, while her husband is away on business, she determines to raise her son from the dead. Armed with a magic book and a "Key of Solomon" (in this case, a talisman rather than a book), she conjures up dark forces to bring her son back. Before going to bed, a vicious thunderstorm approaches the luxurious beach mansion. Hearing a knock, she opens the door to discover her son. After cleaning him up, she begins to make him feel at home again. However, all does not work out when Bobby goes completely mad and begins to terrorize his mother in the dark house with a sledgehammer and a butcher knife. The mother soon realizes that it is not Bobby who returned to her, but a demon that had taken his place, as he says "Bobby hates you, Mommy, so he sent me instead," revealing his demon-like face, after which the screen blacks out.

He Who Kills
This segment, about the Zuni Fetish Doll "He Who Kills", is a sequel to the third segment of the original film Trilogy of Terror, "Amelia".
 
After finding the double homicide of Amelia and her mother from the first movie with the Zuni Fetish Doll at the scene, the local police drop off the doll to local Dr. Simpson (Lysette Anthony). As she begins to examine the doll, she learns that the doll comes to life when a gold chain is removed from his neck and that the Zuni Fetish Doll has a desire for flesh. It also seems to regenerate (the idea itself initially laughable to both Dr. Simpson and her assistant) as when she chips away the charred wood, the Zuni Fetish Doll seems to be brand new.

After a quick pizza break, she discovers the doll missing. One of the officers investigates the surrounding museum, only to be shot down by an arrow from one of the exhibits, courtesy of the doll. After minutes of looking, she finds the doll attacking and running towards her with a lab knife as a weapon. Now Dr. Simpson is all alone in a large museum with a tiny killer on the loose.
Much like the first movie, Dr. Simpson catches the Zuni Fetish Doll in a briefcase, giving her time to try to reach her keys. As the doll cuts through the case, Dr. Simpson tries twice to grab the knife, only to get cut as in the first film. The doll eventually breaks through, meeting the stabbing force of a screwdriver-like object from Dr. Simpson. Making the same mistake as the first film's protagonist, Dr. Simpson opens the briefcase, only to be bitten ferociously by the Zuni Fetish Doll. She eventually regains control and tosses the doll into a large rectangular container of sulfuric acid. As the Zuni Fetish Doll comes to a halt in its motion, Dr. Simpson goes to grab tongs in an attempt to remove the doll, only to be possessed by He Who Kills, the spirit inhabiting the doll. Later on, she kills her date with the same ax she tried to use against the Zuni Fetish Doll.

Cast

 Lysette Anthony as Laura, Alma, and Dr. Simpson 
 Geraint Wyn Davies as Ben 
 Matt Clark as Ansford 
 Geoffrey Lewis as Stubbs 
 Blake Heron as Bobby 
 Richard Fitzpatrick as Jerry O'Farrell 
 Thomas Mitchell as Lew 
 Gerry Quigley as Akers 
 Dennis O'Connor as Brig 
 John McMahon as Taylor 
 Alan Bridle as the Minister 
 Brittaney Bennett as the Waitress 
 Norm Spencer as Officer #1 
 Bruce McFee as Officer #2 
 Joe Gieb as the Dwarf Bobby 
 Alex Carter as Breslow 
 Philip Williams as Pete 
 Tom Melissis as Rothstein 
 Aron Tager as Steve 
 Durward Allen as Spaulding 
 Peter Keleghan as Dennis

Production
Trilogy of Terror II was produced by Dan Curtis Productions and first aired on Showtime on October 30, 1996. The film was directed by Dan Curtis, who also directed the 1975 TV movie Trilogy of Terror which inspired this sequel. The screenplay was written by Richard Matheson, who also wrote the original movie.

Home media releases
Trilogy of Terror II was released on DVD by Universal Studios Home Entertainment on September 2, 2008.

Reception

Brett Gallman from Oh, the Horror! gave the film a mixed review, feeling that the film "a quick way to cash in on a well-known property". TV Guide awarded the film 1/5 stars, calling it "belated", and felt that it was essentially a rerun of the original film.

References

External links
 
 
 

Demons in film
1996 television films
1996 horror films
1996 films
American horror anthology films
American horror television films
Films based on works by Richard Matheson
Films based on short fiction
USA Network original films
Films directed by Dan Curtis
Films with screenplays by Richard Matheson
American supernatural horror films
1990s supernatural horror films
1990s American films